Subhrajit Saikia (born 9 December 1974) is a former Indian cricketer who played domestic cricket for Assam cricket team. He is a left-handed batsman who bowled right-arm medium pace. Saikia made his first-class debut for Assam in the 1993/94 season of Ranji Trophy. He played 43 first-class matches with highest score of 127 and 29 List A matches.

Saikia was the coach of Assam cricket team during 2012/13 domestic season. Under his tenure as coach the team became the runners up of 2013 Vijay Hazare Trophy. It was Assam's biggest achievement in domestic cricket so far.

References

External links
 

1974 births
Living people
Indian cricketers
Assam cricketers
East Zone cricketers
Cricketers from Assam